West Franklin is an unincorporated community in Marrs Township, Posey County, in the U.S. state of Indiana.

History
West Franklin was laid out in 1837. A post office was established at West Franklin in 1837, and remained in operation until 1902. With the construction of the railroad, business activity shifted to nearby Caborn, and the town's population dwindled.

Geography

References

Unincorporated communities in Posey County, Indiana
Unincorporated communities in Indiana